Elizabeth D. Laporte is a former United States magistrate judge of the United States District Court for the Northern District of California. She retired from the court on October 25, 2019. She previously served as the Chief U.S. Magistrate Judge for the District from 2013–2015.

Education
Laporte earned her undergraduate degree from Princeton University in 1975, obtained a master's degree from Oxford University as a Marshall Scholar from 1975 to 1977, and received her Juris Doctor degree from Yale Law School in 1982.

Career
Upon graduating law school, Laporte served as a judicial law clerk for the Honorable Marilyn Hall Patel, U.S. District Judge of the United States District Court for the Northern District of California from 1982 to 1983.

From 1983-1991, Laporte worked as an Associate, and then became Partner at the law firm of Turner & Brorby.

In 1991-1996, she served as an administrative law judge for the California Department of Insurance.

From 1996-1998, Laporte was Chief of Special Litigation for the San Francisco City Attorney's Office.

Judicial service
On April 4, 1998, Laporte was appointed as a United States magistrate judge for the Northern District of California. She later served as Chief U.S. Magistrate Judge of the District from 2013-2015.

Judge Laporte has also served as the Northern District of California's Alternative Dispute Resolution (ADR) Magistrate Judge and chaired the Rules Committee's E-Discovery Subcommittee. She is also a judicial observer for the Sedona Conference Working Group on Electronic Document Retention and Production and a former member of the U.S. Court of Appeals for the Federal Circuit's Bench Bar E-Discovery Committee. At the U.S. Court of Appeals for the Ninth Circuit, Judge Laporte has chaired the Magistrate Judge Executive Board and served on the Jury Trial Improvement Committee. Judge Laporte also regularly speaks at legal conferences and judicial education programs on intellectual property, e-discovery, settlement, employment law and other topics and has authored articles on patent litigation, settlement and e-discovery as well.

Judge Laporte further serves on the editorial board of the Federal Courts Law Review, the Board of Governors for the Northern California Chapter of the Association of Business Trial Lawyers and the Judicial Advisory Board of The Sedona Conference.

Judge Laporte is also the author of "Managing the Runaway Patent Case," an article published in the Summer 2003 issue of the Northern California Association of Business Trial Lawyers (ABTL) Report, and "Getting the Most Out of Judicial Settlement Conferences," published in the Winter 2006 issue. She also served as a judicial reviewer to the Continuing Education of the Bar's (CEB's) California Civil Discovery Practice, and authored an article on the 2006 e-discovery amendments to the Federal Rules of Civil Procedure for CEB's Civil Litigation Reporter.

She is also responsible for creating the Jenkins-Laporte doctrine with former U.S. District Judge Martin Jenkins.

Accolades
Laporte was named Lawyer of the Year by California Lawyer in 1996.

She also received the Judicial Leadership award for the Electronic Discovery Institute in 2015.

External links
The Honorable Elizabeth D. Laporte, U.S. Magistrate Judge, United States District Court for the Northern District of California
Extended Biography of Elizabeth D. Laporte

References

Living people
Year of birth missing (living people)
20th-century American judges
21st-century American judges
20th-century American lawyers
21st-century American women judges
Alumni of the University of Oxford
American women lawyers
People from San Francisco
Princeton University alumni
United States magistrate judges
Yale Law School alumni
20th-century American women judges